Juan Manuel Rodríguez Domínguez (born 28 February 1972), commonly known as Juanma, is a Spanish retired footballer who played as a central defender, and the current manager of Recreativo de Huelva B.

Playing career
Born in Huelva, Andalusia, Juanma finished his formation with Recreativo de Huelva, and made his senior debuts while on loan at Club Atlético Cortegana. He returned from loan in the 1993 summer, being immediately assigned to the main squad in Segunda División B.

Juanma appeared regularly in the following campaigns, but eventually lost his starting spot in 1997–98 as his side was promoted to Segunda División. In the 1998 summer he left Recre and moved to AD Ceuta also in the third level.

In 2001 Juanma moved abroad for the first time in his career, joining G.D. Estoril Praia after a spell at Algeciras CF. After appearing in only one match he returned to his native country, signing for Bollullos CF.

Juanma eventually played in the lower leagues for the remainder of his career, and retired with CD Punta Umbría.

Post-playing career
After his retirement Juanma became Manolo Zambrano's assistant at his first club Recreativo, and maintained his role under Lucas Alcaraz. He left the club in 2009, but returned on 14 June 2011, as Juan Carlos Ríos' second.

On 10 March 2012 Juanma was appointed manager of the main squad, after Álvaro Cervera's resignation. He only achieved two wins in 15 games, as his side narrowly avoided relegation; he returned to his previous role after the end of the season, and left Recre in the 2013 summer.

References

External links

1972 births
Living people
Footballers from Huelva
Spanish footballers
Association football defenders
Segunda División B players
Tercera División players
Recreativo de Huelva players
AD Ceuta footballers
Algeciras CF footballers
G.D. Estoril Praia players
Spanish expatriate footballers
Spanish expatriate sportspeople in Portugal
Expatriate footballers in Portugal
Spanish football managers
Segunda División managers
Recreativo de Huelva managers